The 1884 United States presidential election in Texas was held on November 4, 1884, as part of the 1884 United States presidential election. State voters chose 13 electors to represent the state in the Electoral College, which chose the president and vice president.

Texas voted for the Democratic nominee Grover Cleveland, who received 69.3% of the vote. With 69.3% of the popular vote, the Lone Star State would prove to be Cleveland's second strongest state only after South Carolina.

Results

See also
 United States presidential elections in Texas

References

1884
Texas
1884 Texas elections